Abelodon is an extinct genus of peramurid mammal in the clade Zatheria, which lived during the Barremian age. It is known from a single tooth found in Cameroon's Koum Formation.

Paleoecology 
Abelodon lived alongside various archosaurs in the Koum Formation, such as ornithopod dinosaurs like Ouranosaurus, theropods like Spinosaurus, and crocodilians like Araripesuchus.

References 

Aptian genera
Early Cretaceous mammals of Africa
Cretaceous Cameroon
Fossils of Cameroon
Fossil taxa described in 1989
Prehistoric mammal genera
Cladotheria